Blood from a Stone is a 2011 French drama film directed by Jacques Maillot.

Cast 
 Daniel Auteuil as Georges Pierret
 Maud Wyler as Jessica
 Yann Trégouët as Luis
  as Yannick
 Moussa Maaskri as Hassan
  as Richard
 Carole Franck as Hyacinthe
 Marc Chapiteau as Claude

References

External links 

2011 drama films
2011 films
French drama films
2010s French films